Transfusion may refer to:
 Blood transfusion, the introduction of blood directly into an individual’s blood circulation through a vein
 Platelet transfusion, the infusion of platelets into an individual's blood
 Transfusion (journal), a research journal on blood transfusion and related topics published by the AABB
 "Transfusion" (short story), a 1959 science fiction story by Chad Oliver
 Transfusion, a port of the Blood video game to the Quake engine
 Transfusion (band), a Canadian band active in 1968
 Transfusion, a 2005 album by Cold Blood (band)
 Transfusion (EP), a 1993 EP by Powderfinger
 "Transfusion" (song), a 1956 novelty hit by Nervous Norvus